Firooz Sofeh Isfahan Futsal Club was an Iranian futsal club based in Isfahan.

Season-by-season
The table below chronicles the achievements of the Club in various competitions.

Famous players 
  Ghodrat Bahadori
  Mostafa Tayyebi
  Hossein Azimi
 Davoud Abbasi
  Javad Asghari Moghaddam

References 

Futsal clubs in Iran
Sport in Isfahan
Futsal clubs established in 2008
Sports clubs disestablished in 2012
2008 establishments in Iran
2012 disestablishments in Iran
Defunct futsal clubs in Iran